James Angus Gerald "Old Hardrock" Mortson (January 24, 1925 – August 8, 2015) was a Canadian ice hockey defenceman in the National Hockey League (NHL). He played for the Toronto Maple Leafs, Chicago Black Hawks, and Detroit Red Wings, winning four Stanley Cups with Toronto. He also played in eight NHL All Star Games.

Early career
Mortson grew up in Northern Ontario. He joined the St. Michael's Majors of the Ontario Hockey Association Jr. league in 1943–44 and played two seasons for them. He then turned professional and played for the United States Hockey League's Tulsa Oilers in 1945–46, compiling 48 points in 51 games.

National Hockey League
In 1946–47 Mortson joined the NHL's Toronto Maple Leafs, where he played for the next six seasons. He and fellow defenceman Jim Thomson were known as the "Gold Dust Twins", and the two helped the Maple Leafs win Stanley Cups in 1947, 1948, 1949, and 1951. In the 1948 All Star game, Mortson and Gordie Howe squared off and, as of 2015, are the only players to fight in an NHL All-Star Game. In 1950, Mortson was named to the league's first all-star team.

In 1952 Mortson was traded to the Chicago Black Hawks, along with Cal Gardner, Ray Hannigan, and Al Rollins, for Harry Lumley. Mortson played for the Black Hawks for six seasons. In 1956–57 he led the league in penalty minutes for the fourth time. He was then traded to the Detroit Red Wings in 1958 and played one season for them. Mortson played 797 games and had 198 points and 1,380 penalty minutes in his 13-year NHL career. He was known for his physical play and got into numerous fights.

Later career
After his NHL career ended, Mortson played professional hockey with the American Hockey League's Buffalo Bisons, and retired in 1967 while playing semi-professional with the Oakville Oaks of the Ontario Hockey Association Senior A League.

Post-hockey and death
After retirement from hockey Mortson was involved in the food and beverage business and lived in Oakville, Ontario. In 1970, he moved to Timmins becoming a stockbroker and later as a mining company representative. He died in Timmins, Ontario, on August 8, 2015. He was 90 years old, survived by wife Sheila and six children, and predeceased by one son.

Awards and achievements
1947  Stanley Cup  Championship  (Toronto)
1948  Stanley Cup  Championship  (Toronto)
1949  Stanley Cup  Championship  (Toronto)
1951  Stanley Cup  Championship  (Toronto)
1947  NHL All-Star (Toronto)
1948  NHL All-Star (Toronto)
1950  NHL All-Star (Toronto)
1951  NHL All-Star (Toronto)
1952  NHL All-Star (Toronto)
1953  NHL All-Star (Chicago)
1954  NHL All-Star (Chicago)
1956  NHL All-Star (Chicago)

Career statistics

Regular season and playoffs
Bold indicates led league

References

External links

1925 births
2015 deaths
Buffalo Bisons (AHL) players
Canadian ice hockey coaches
Canadian ice hockey defencemen
Chatham Maroons (IHL) players
Chicago Blackhawks captains
Detroit Red Wings players
Ice hockey people from Ontario
Ontario Hockey Association Senior A League (1890–1979) players
Sportspeople from Temiskaming Shores
Sportspeople from Timmins
Stanley Cup champions
Toronto Maple Leafs players
Toronto St. Michael's Majors players
Tulsa Oilers (USHL) players
Canadian expatriate ice hockey players in the United States